Paraptenodytes robustus is a species of the extinct penguin genus Paraptenodytes, which is known from fossils.

The fossils of this species are known from several dozen bones, found in Early Miocene rocks of the Gaimán Formation. Documented locations are near La Cueva, Trelew in Chubut Province, and Puerto San Julián in Santa Cruz Province, Argentina. Most remains are only tentatively assigned to this species, however, and the tarsometatarsus formerly referred to as Treleudytes crassus may belong to a completely different species. On the other hand, Paraptenodytes brodkorbi is probably synonymous with P. robustus.

References

Further reading 
 Ameghino, Florentino (1895): Sur les oiseaux fossiles de Patagonie. Bol. Inst. Geogr. Argentina 15 501–602. [Article in French]
 Simpson, George Gaylord (1946): Fossil penguins. Bull. Am. Mus. Nat. Hist. 87: 7-99. PDF fulltext
 Simpson, George Gaylord (1971): Conspectus of Patagonian fossil penguins. American Museum Novitates 2488: 1-37. PDF fulltext

Paraptenodytes
Extinct penguins
Miocene birds of South America
Colhuehuapian
Santacrucian
Neogene Argentina
Fossils of Argentina
Gaiman Formation
Fossil taxa described in 1894
Taxa named by Florentino Ameghino